The A9 motorway, a motorway in western Switzerland, is a divided highway connecting from Ballaigues (in northwest) to southwestern Switzerland. It is part of the National Road N9.

It is double-tracked as a divided highway (directionally separated) in most sections. The N9/A9 runs from Ballaigues on the French border via Vevey, Sion, Brig on the Simplon Pass up to Gondo on the Italian border. The line Sierre-Gamsen is still under construction and not passable. The construction of this  line will cost 2270 million CHF: it is funded at 4% by the Canton of Valais and at 96% by the Swiss federal government.

Major engineering works
The following are major construction projects underway along A9:
 Sierre-Gamsen-VS line

Junction list

Notes

References

 "Die Schweizer Autobahnen", Autobahnen.ch, 2009, web: Autobahnen.ch (with sub-webpage for A9).
 More sources in "Motorways of Switzerland".

External links
 Rhone-Autobahn A9
 Photos: A9 on Autobahnen.ch
 Project Brig-Gondo (Simplon)
 Project Bex-Martigny
 Project Schwerverkehrskontrollzentrum St. Maurice (traffic-control center)

A09